Bethel is an unincorporated community in Wakulla County, Florida, United States.

Notes

Unincorporated communities in Wakulla County, Florida
Unincorporated communities in Florida